Macaduma fusca is a moth of the subfamily Arctiinae. It was described by George Hampson in 1900. It is found on New Guinea.

References

Macaduma
Moths described in 1900